Funkdoobiest was an American hip hop group from Los Angeles, California, United States, composed of rappers Jason "Son Doobie" Vasquez, Tyrone "Tomahawk Funk" Pacheco and DJ Ralph "Tha Phunky Mexican" Medrano. They are members of the Soul Assassins collective. The group has released four studio albums. Their third LP, The Troubleshooters, was recorded and released without any participation of Tomahawk Funk due to his departure from the group.

The group's most successful hit single, "Bow Wow Wow" from their debut album Which Doobie U B?, peaked at number 89 on the Billboard Hot 100 singles chart in the United States. They appeared in the soundtrack to Allison Anders' 1994 film Mi Vida Loca with the song "The Good Hit". The song "Superhoes" from their second album Brothas Doobie was featured in the soundtrack to F. Gary Gray's 1995 film Friday. The song "Act On It" from their third album was used in the Kirk Wong's 1998 film The Big Hit.

From 2003 to 2004, Son Doobie has released two solo full-length albums via Battle Axe Records, Funk Superhero and Doobie Deluxe.

Discography

Albums

Singles

References

External links
Funkdoobiest at Discogs
DJ Ralph M Interview NAMM Oral History Library (2020)

Hip hop groups from California
Musical groups from Los Angeles
Musical groups established in 1989
Epic Records artists
RCA Records artists
Five percenters